Notable bridges named Fourth Bridge include:

 Fourth Nanjing Yangtze Bridge, across Yangtze River in Nanjing, Jiangsu, China.
 Godavari Fourth Bridge, across Godavari River in Rajahmundry, Andhra Pradesh, India.
 Fourth Thai–Lao Friendship Bridge, across Mekong River (and Thai-Lao border).
 Fourth Panama Canal Bridge, a Panama Canal crossing under construction.
 Fourth Mainland Bridge, a proposed Lagos Lagoon crossing in Lagos, Nigeria.

See also
 Forth Bridge (disambiguation) 
 Forth Bridge, railway bridge in Scotland